West Cape Howe is a coastal headland near Albany, Western Australia that forms the westernmost extent of the Great Australian Bight.

History 
West Cape Howe was originally named Cape Howe by Captain George Vancouver on 28 September 1791, in honour of Admiral Howe.  This Cape Howe was renamed West Cape Howe by Matthew Flinders on 8 December 1801, to distinguish it from the Cape Howe in eastern Australia.

See also 
 West Cape Howe National Park

References 

West Howe
South coast of Western Australia